Mohamad Abdul Hadi (born 26 October 1966) is a Malaysian field hockey player. He competed in the 1992 Summer Olympics.

References

External links

1966 births
Living people
Field hockey players at the 1992 Summer Olympics
Malaysian male field hockey players
Olympic field hockey players of Malaysia
Field hockey players at the 1986 Asian Games
Field hockey players at the 1990 Asian Games
Asian Games medalists in field hockey
Asian Games bronze medalists for Malaysia
Medalists at the 1990 Asian Games